The Freedom Party (PL), formerly known as the Socialist Movement for Integration (LSI), is a social democratic political party in Albania. The party was formed on 6 September 2004, when Ilir Meta defected from the Socialist Party of Albania (PS). A proposal to change its logo, name and other symbols was unanimously approved at the party's National Convention (Congress) on 25 July 2022.

Through the use of the term "movement", the party attempted to give the message that it is open and inclusive. The other reason for using this term was its intention to differentiate itself from the other parties. It employed the one member, one vote system in March 2005 to elect its leader, Ilir Meta.

Elections
At the 2005 parliamentary election the party won five seats in the Albanian Parliament with 8.4% of the vote. The party was mostly supported by the Albanian youth at the 2005 elections. At the 2009 parliamentary election it won four seats with 4.8% of the vote. The party along with PSV91 became the determining parties to form the government coalition. In June 2009 the PL allied with the centre-right Democratic Party of Albania (PD) to form the government coalition.

PL successfully increased its share of the vote in the 2013 parliamentary election, winning 16 seats with 10.4% of the vote.

Leader of the Party
Ilir Meta founded the party and remained Leader of the Party until 30 April 2017. On 28 April 2017 he was elected the 7th President of Albania and left the Party. Petrit Vasili, a prominent figure inside the party served as the party leader, until 29 June, resigning after the election results. Monika Kryemadhi, Meta's wife, was then voted in as party leader. Although she is the spouse of then-President Meta, she refused to take the honorific position of the First Lady of Albania, conceding the post to her oldest daughter. On 25 July 2022, Meta returned to the party as leader after his presidency had ended. Subsequently, the party's name was changed to the Freedom Party.

References

External links 

Official website

2004 establishments in Albania
Political parties established in 2004
Political parties in Albania
Pro-European political parties in Albania
Social democratic parties in Albania